Dolly Zohur (born 17 July 1953) is a Bangladeshi film, television and stage actress. She earned Bangladesh National Film Award for Lifetime Achievement (2021) from Bangladesh government. She received Bangladesh National Film Awards 2 times - as the Best Actress and the Best Supporting Actress for her roles in the films  Shonkhonil Karagar and Ghani (2006) respectively.

Early life and education 
Johur began acting at a very young age. Her brother took her try out for different acting jobs when they were young. She attended University of Dhaka, where she got involved with theater.  During that time, she was enrolled at Natyachakra and Chhayanaut.

Career
Johur got her breakthrough by the character Nilu in the drama serial Ei Shob Din Ratri by Humayun Ahmed. She has acted in several television dramas on Maasranga Television, ATN Bangla and BTV.

Personal life

She married actor Johurul Islam in 1976, who died in 2006.They have one son together, named Riasat.

Works

Television
 Ei Shob Din Ratri (1985)
Atimanab (2007)
Joge Biyoge (2007)
Tuntuni Villa (2008)
 Meghe Dhaka Shohor (2018)
 Shohorbash (2022)

Films
 Shonkhonil Karagar (1992)
 Aguner Poroshmoni (1995)
 Shopner Thikana (1995)
 Dipu Number Two (1996)
 Anondo Osru (1997)
 Jibon Chabi (1999)
 Wrong Number (2004)
 Nirontor (2006)
 Ghani (2006)
 Daruchini Dwip (2007)
 Dui Prithibi (2015 film) (2015)

Stage dramas
 Manush (2003)
 Noashal (2014)
 Shesher Ratri (2015)

References

External links
 

Living people
University of Dhaka alumni
Bangladeshi film actresses
Best Actress National Film Awards (Bangladesh) winners
1953 births
People from Dhaka
Best Supporting Actress Bachsas Award winners
Best Supporting Actress National Film Award (Bangladesh) winners
National Film Award (Bangladesh) for Lifetime Achievement recipients